Fukuda is a Japanese surname. Notable people with the surname include:

, Japanese long jumper
, Japanese historian of political thought
, Japanese singer
, Japanese politician
, Japanese feminist activist
, Japanese film director
, Japanese speed skater
, photographer
Keiji Fukuda (born c. 1955), American physician with expertise in influenza epidemiology
, Japanese-American judo 10th dan
Koichi Fukuda, Japanese-American guitarist/keyboardist in Static-X
, Japanese mathematician
, Japanese footballer
, Japanese professional wrestler
, Japanese tennis player
, Japanese Actress
, Japanese animation director
Robert Fukuda (1922–2013), American politician and lawyer
, Japanese critic and philosopher
, Japanese sculptor and graphic designer
, Japanese classical guitarist
, Japanese basketball player and coach
, Japanese baseball player
, 67th Prime Minister of Japan
, Japanese politician
, Japanese hurdler
, Japanese economist
, Japanese sport wrestler and sports official
, Japanese footballer
, Japanese photographer
, Japanese dramatist, translator and literary critic
, Japanese composer and keyboardist
, 91st Prime Minister of Japan
, founder of Aiful consumer finance company

See also
Fukuda Denshi Arena, a football stadium in Chiba, Japan

Japanese-language surnames

Steve W. Fukuda, a Japanese American photographer